Montego Glover (born February 9, 1974) is an American stage actress and singer. She has been nominated for the Tony Award for Best Actress in a Musical for her role in the musical Memphis and won the Drama Desk Award for Outstanding Actress in a Musical.

From September 9, 2017 to March 31, 2019, Glover portrayed Angelica Schuyler in the Chicago cast of the Broadway blockbuster Hamilton.

Life and career
Glover was born in Macon, Georgia and raised in Chattanooga, Tennessee. She attended the Chattanooga School for the Arts & Sciences and then attended Florida State University, Tallahassee, Florida, where she graduated with a Bachelor of Fine Arts in Music Theatre with Honors. Glover sang in church choirs "for as long as I can remember".

She has performed on Broadway in the musical Memphis as Felicia. Glover received a nomination for the Tony Award for Best Performance by a Leading Actress in a Musical for her performance. Additionally, she won the Drama Desk Award for Outstanding Actress in a Musical (in a tie with Catherine Zeta-Jones). She displays a "rich, rangy and emotionally powerful voice in several standout numbers" according to Playbill. Montego has been with Memphis since it started, including four regional productions and appears in the live filming of the musical, Memphis: Direct from Broadway.

Her Broadway debut was as an understudy for Celie and Nettie in the musical The Color Purple.

In other work, she has been a "Star Wars videogame avatar and a TV commercial voice-over artist."  She worked at Walt Disney World in Orlando, Florida in the late 1990s. Her voice is featured on the Festival of the Lion King official soundtrack.

She also guest starred on the USA Network show, White Collar in the episode "Judgement Day".

In September 2022, she started sharing the role of the Witch with Patina Miller in the 2022 Broadway revival of Into the Woods. She left the production on December 15 being replaced by Joaquina Kalukango. She is set to reprise her role in the 2023 national tour.

Work
Dreamgirls - Special Benefit Concert, September 24, 2001*
Aida - Music Theatre of Wichita, August 2005
The Color Purple - Broadway, Understudy and Replacement, March 2007
Memphis - Broadway, "Felicia", October 19, 2009
Memphis: Direct from Broadway - Film, April 28, 2011
Made in Jersey - TV Show, Aired December 1, 2012
It Shoulda Been You - Broadway, 2015
Les Misérables - Fantine - Broadway, 2015
Hamilton - Angelica Schuyler - Chicago, September 7, 2017 - March 31, 2019
Into the Woods - The Witch - Broadway, 2022 - Tour, 2023

References

External links
Montego Glover Official Web Site

 

Living people

1974 births
American musical theatre actresses

American stage actresses
Drama Desk Award winners
Actresses from Georgia (U.S. state)
African-American actresses
21st-century American actresses
Actors from Macon, Georgia
Actresses from Tennessee
People from Chattanooga, Tennessee
Florida State University alumni
American television actresses
Dora Mavor Moore Award winners
20th-century African-American women singers
21st-century African-American women
21st-century African-American people